Magic Palayok (International title: Magic Pot) is a 2011 Philippine television drama fantasy comedy series broadcast by GMA Network. Directed by Joel Lamangan, it stars Geoff Eigenmann, Carla Abellana and Angeli Nicole Sanoy. It premiered on February 28, 2011 on the network's Telebabad line up replacing Bantatay. The series concluded on July 1, 2011 with a total of 88 episodes. It was replaced by Futbolilits in its timeslot.

The series is streaming online on YouTube.

Cast and characters

Lead cast
 Geoff Eigenmann as Richard "Jude" Cruz
 Carla Abellana as Pilar Sallave-Cruz
 Angeli Nicole Sanoy as Corazon "Cookie" De Leon

Supporting cast
 Chynna Ortaleza as Natasha Ledesma
 Cherie Gil as Yvonne Ledesma
 Manilyn Reynes as Magic Palayok
 Jay R as Nico
 Frank Garcia as Ricky
 Gino Dela Pena as Clifford
 Kyrshee Francesca Gregia as Yanyan
 Bianca Umali as Dina
 Nixon Castro as Macoy
 Francesca Salcedo as Suyen
 Lovely Rivero as Gemma Sallave
 Luigi Revilla as Kirby Sallave
 Edwin Reyes as Andong Sallave
 Vicky Ortega
 Ernie Zarate as Ipe Calevio
 Lou Sison as Noemi Santiago
 Pekto
 Maimai Davao
 Rubi Rubi as Rosa
 Moi Bien as Elma
 Cris Pasturan
 Ruby Ruiz

Guest cast
 Mikee Cojuangco as Isadora De Leon
 Tado Jimenez as Mac Enriquez
 Polo Ravales as Cardo
 Sunshine Garcia as Glenda
 Onyok Velasco
 Buboy Villar as Isko
 Vaness del Moral as Magic Sandok
 Isay Alvarez as Alicia Calevio
 Dexter Doria as Flor
 Janice de Belen as Magic Palayok
 Carme Sanchez
 Afi Africa
 Romnick Sarmenta as Richard "James" Cruz
 Pauleen Luna as Gloomera
 Carmi Martin as Alina Ledesma

Ratings
According to AGB Nielsen Philippines' Mega Manila People/Individual television ratings, the pilot episode of Magic Palayok earned an 11.1% rating.

References

External links
 
 

2011 Philippine television series debuts
2011 Philippine television series endings
Fantaserye and telefantasya
Filipino-language television shows
GMA Network drama series
Television shows set in the Philippines